Proisocrinus ruberrimus is a species of crinoids that is in the monotypic genus Proisocrinus. The genus is in the monotypic family Proisocrinidae

Genus and species
 Proisocrinidae
 Proisocrinus
 P. ruberrimus

References

Isocrinida
Monotypic echinoderm genera
Crinoid genera